Events in 2009 in anime.

Accolades
At the Mainichi Film Awards, Summer Wars won the Animation Film Award and Denshin-Bashira Elemi no Koi won the Ōfuji Noburō Award. Summer Wars also won the Japan Academy Prize for Animation of the Year. Internationally, The Sky Crawlers, Summer Wars and First Squad were nominated for the Asia Pacific Screen Award for Best Animated Feature Film.

Releases

Films
A list of anime that debuted in theaters between January 1 and December 31, 2009.

Television series
A list of anime television series that debuted between January 1 and December 31, 2009.

Original net animations
A list of original net animations that debuted between January 1 and December 31, 2009.

Original video animations
A list of original video animations that debuted between January 1 and December 31, 2009.

See also
2009 in animation

References

External links 
Japanese animated works of the year, listed in the IMDb

Years in anime
2009 in animation
2009 in Japan